Acleris kearfottana is a species of moth of the family Tortricidae. It is found in North America, where it has been recorded from Maine, Ontario, Pennsylvania, Quebec and West Virginia.

The wingspan is about 15 mm. The forewings are pale orange-yellow with faint traces of reticulation. The hindwings are light smoky. Adults have been recorded on wing in April, July and from October to November.

The larvae feed on Comptonia peregrina, Myrica (including Myrica gale) and Hamamelis species.

References

Moths described in 1934
kearfottana
Moths of North America